Saltnes is a village on the island of Eysturoy, Faroe Islands, in Nes Municipality.

The population was 152 in August 2022.

See also
 List of towns in the Faroe Islands

References 

Populated places in the Faroe Islands